126 Windsor Street, Richmond is a heritage-listed residence at 126 Windsor Street, Richmond, City of Hawkesbury, New South Wales, Australia. It is also known as the Home of John Town and Heritage Cottage. It was added to the New South Wales State Heritage Register on 2 April 1999.

History

Indigenous history
The lower Hawkesbury was home to the Dharug people. The proximity to the Nepean River and South Creek qualifies it as a key area for food resources for indigenous groups. The Dharug and Darkinjung people called the river Deerubbin and it was a vital source of food and transport.

Colonial history
Governor Arthur Phillip explored the local area in search of suitable agricultural land in 1789 and discovered and named the Hawkesbury River after Baron Hawkesbury. This region played a significant role in the early development of the colony with European settlers established here by 1794. Situated on fertile floodplains and well known for its abundant agriculture, Green Hills (as it was originally called) supported the colony through desperate times. However, frequent flooding meant that the farmers along the riverbanks were often ruined.

On 1 January 1810, Lachlan Macquarie replaced William Bligh as Governor of New South Wales. Under Macquarie's influence the colony prospered. His vision was for a free community, working in conjunction with the penal colony. He implemented a substantial public works program, completing 265 public buildings, establishing new public amenities and improving existing services such as roads. Under his leadership Hawkesbury district thrived. He visited the district on his first tour and recorded in his journal on 6 December 1810: "After dinner I chrestened the new townships...I gave the name of Windsor to the town intended to be erected in the district of the Green Hills...the township in the Richmond district I have named Richmond..." the district reminded Macquarie of those towns in England, whilst Castlereagh, Pitt Town and Wilberforce were named after English statesmen. These are often referred to as Macquarie's Five Towns. Their localities, chiefly Windsor and Richmond, became more permanent with streets, town square and public buildings.

126 Windsor Street

126 Windsor St was built  1840 for ex-convict turned successful businessman John Town (senior) and his wife Mary Pickett. Town had arrived in Australia in 1800 and after gaining his freedom had operated a milling business at Kurrajong.

In the late 1970s, the building was threatened with demolition for a planned car yard. Demolition had already commenced when the building was purchased by the state government on the advice of the Heritage Council of New South Wales, the first to be acquired under new heritage preservation powers. The work on 126 Windsor Street was intended to serve as an example of the way a building in poor condition which was threatened by demolition can be restored and given a new lease of life at a moderate cost.

The Heritage Council auctioned the property in 1985. It was at some stage used as "Heritage Cottage", a museum and coffee shop, but this is no longer operating.

Description

126 Windsor Street is a single-storey cottage of three bays with a two-storey wing running parallel to the side street. It is constructed of brick, stuccoed and painted on exterior. Main roof is hipped and of iron, verandah roof is supported on turned timber columns. Exterior joinery is mostly intact. Particularly fine is the reeded panelling of the French windows. The grounds retain some mature trees.

Significance

A fine example of a mid-nineteenth century Australian colonial town dwelling. It is also a very important part of the townscape of Richmond as it is the only such dwelling remaining on the Sydney approaches.

Heritage listing 

126 Windsor Street, Richmond was listed on the New South Wales State Heritage Register on 2 April 1999.

References

Bibliography

Attribution 
 
 

New South Wales State Heritage Register
Richmond, New South Wales
Houses in New South Wales
Articles incorporating text from the New South Wales State Heritage Register